The Deduru Oya is the sixth-longest river of Sri Lanka. It runs across four provinces and five districts.

Tributaries 
 Kospothu Oya
 Dik Oya
 Ratwila Ela
 Kimbulwana Oya
 Hakwatuna Oya
 Maguru Oya
 Kolamunu Oya

Its catchment area receives approximately 4,313 million cubic metres of rain per year, and approximately 27 percent of the water reaches the sea. It has a catchment area of 2,620 square kilometres.

References 

Bodies of water of Kurunegala District
Bodies of water of Puttalam District
Rivers of Sri Lanka